The 2021 Troy Trojans softball team represented Troy University during the 2021 NCAA Division I softball season. The Trojans played their home games at Troy Softball Complex. The Trojans were led by seventh-year head coach Beth Mullins and were members of the Sun Belt Conference.

Preseason

Sun Belt Conference Coaches Poll
The Sun Belt Conference Coaches Poll was released on February 8, 2021. Troy was picked to finish second in the Sun Belt Conference with 87 votes.

Preseason All-Sun Belt team
Summer Ellyson (LA, SR, Pitcher)
Leanna Johnson (TROY, SO, Pitcher)
Allisa Dalton (LA, SR, Shortstop/3rd Base)
Katie Webb (TROY, SR, Infielder/1st Base)
Raina O'Neal (LA, JR, Outfielder)
Julie Raws (LA, SR, Catcher)
Courney Dean (CCU, SR, Outfielder)
Mekhia Freeman (GASO, SR, Outfielder)
Korie Kreps (ULM, JR, Outfielder)
Kaitlyn Alderink (LA, SR, 2nd Base)
Jade Gortarez (LA, SR, Shortstop/3rd Base)
Ciara Bryan (LA, SR, Outfielder)
Kelly Horne (TROY, SO, Infielder/2nd Base)
Makiya Thomas (CCU, SR, Outfielder/Infielder)
Tara Oltmann (TXST, SR, Infielder/Shortstop)
Jayden Mount (ULM, SR, Infielder)
Katie Lively (TROY, SO, Outfielder)

National Softball Signing Day

Roster

Coaching staff

Schedule and results

{| class="toccolours" width=95% style="clear:both; margin:1.5em auto; text-align:center;"
|-
! colspan=2 style="" | 2021 Troy Trojans softball game log
|-
! colspan=2 style="" | Regular Season (34-13)
|- valign="top"
|
{| class="wikitable collapsible" style="margin:auto; width:100%; text-align:center; font-size:95%"
! colspan=12 style="padding-left:4em;" | February (12-3)
|-
! Date
! Opponent
! Rank
! Site/Stadium
! Score
! Win
! Loss
! Save
! TV
! Attendance
! Overall Record
! SBC Record
|-
!colspan=12| Trojan Classic
|- align="center" bgcolor=#ddffdd
|Feb. 12 || Ole Miss || || Troy Softball Complex • Troy, AL || W 5-2 || Johnson (1-0) || Tillman (0-1) || None || || 180 || 1-0 || 
|- align="center" bgcolor=#ddffdd
|Feb. 12 || UAB || || Troy Softball Complex • Troy, AL || W 8-0 || Baker (1-0) || Kachel (0-1) || None || || 122 || 2-0 || 
|- align="center" bgcolor=#ddffdd
|Feb. 13 || Belmont || || Troy Softball Complex • Troy, AL || W 3-1 || Johnson (2-0) || Clesi (0-1) || None ||  || 143 || 3-0 || 
|- align="center" bgcolor=#ddffdd
|Feb. 14 || Belmont || || Troy Softball Complex • Troy, AL || W 8-0 || Bailey (1-0) || Clesi (0-2) || None || || 129 || 4-0 ||
|-
!colspan=12|  
|- align="center" bgcolor=#ffdddd
|Feb. 17 || RV Liberty || || Troy Softball Complex • Troy, AL || L  1-3 || Keeney (3-0) || Johnson (2-1) || None || || 65 || 4-1 || 
|-
!colspan=12|  Troy Invitational
|- align="center" bgcolor=#ddffdd
|Feb. 19 || Western Carolina || || Troy Softball Complex • Troy, AL || W 9-1 || Blasingame (0-1) || Eilers (1-2) || None || || 57 || 5-1 || 
|- align="center" bgcolor=#ddffdd
|Feb. 19 || Mercer || || Troy Softball Complex • Troy, AL || W 12-4 || Bailey (2-0) || Byrd (0-1) || Johnson (1) || || 108 || 6-1 || 
|- align="center" bgcolor=#ddffdd
|Feb. 20 || Western Carolina || || Troy Softball Complex • Troy, AL || W 4-0 || Baker (2-0) || Eilers (1-2) || None || || 132 || 7-1 || 
|- align="center" bgcolor=#ddffdd
|Feb. 21 || Mercer || || Troy Softball Complex • Troy, AL || W 9-1 || Johnson (3-1) || Donner (1-2) || None || || 167 || 8-1 || 
|-
!colspan=12|
|- align="center" bgcolor=#ddffdd
|Feb. 24 || Samford || || Troy Softball Complex • Troy, AL || W 3-2 || Johnson (4-1) || Barnett (1-1) || None || ESPN+ || 87 || 9-1 || 
|- align="center" bgcolor=#ddffdd
|Feb. 24 || Samford || || Troy Softball Complex • Troy, AL || W 7-1 || Johnson (5-1) || Robertson (0-1) || None || ESPN+ || 47 || 10-1 || 
|-
!colspan=12| Crimson Tide Classic
|- align="center" bgcolor=#ddffdd
|Feb. 26 || vs. North Carolina || || Rhoads Stadium • Tuscaloosa, AL || W 2-0 || ''Johnson (6-1) || George (1-2) || None || || 158 || 11-1 || 
|- align="center" bgcolor=#ffdddd
|Feb. 26 || vs. North Carolina || || Rhoads Stadium • Tuscaloosa, AL || L 2-8 || Pickett (4-0) || Baker (2-1) || None || || 123 || 11-2 || 
|- align="center" bgcolor=#ddffdd
|Feb. 27 || vs. Memphis || || Rhoads Stadium • Tuscaloosa, AL || W 6-2 || Johnson (7-1) || Siems (0-2) || None || || 211 || 12-2 || 
|- align="center" bgcolor=#ddffdd
|Feb. 27 || vs. Memphis || || Rhoads Stadium • Tuscaloosa, AL || W 6-1 || Baker (3-1) || Ellett (0-4) || None || || 103 || 13-2 || 
|- align="center" bgcolor=#ffdddd
|Feb. 28 || at No. 4 Alabama || || Rhoads Stadium • Tuscaloosa, AL || L 0-2 || Kilfoyl (6-0) || Johnson (7-2) || None || || 1,121 || 13-3 || 
|-
!colspan=12|
|}
|-
|

|-
|

|-
|

|-
! colspan=2 style="" | Post-Season (3-4)
|-
|

|-
|

|}Schedule Source:*Rankings are based on the team's current ranking in the NFCA/USA Softball poll.

Tuscaloosa Regional

Posteason

Conference accolades 
Player of the Year: Ciara Bryan – LA
Pitcher of the Year: Summer Ellyson – LA
Freshman of the Year: Sara Vanderford – TXST
Newcomer of the Year: Ciara Bryan – LA
Coach of the Year: Gerry Glasco – LAAll Conference First TeamCiara Bryan (LA)
Summer Ellyson (LA)
Sara Vanderford (TXST)Leanna Johnson (TROY)Jessica Mullins (TXST)
Olivia Lackie (USA)
Kj Murphy (UTA)Katie Webb (TROY)Jayden Mount (ULM)
Kandra Lamb (LA)
Kendall Talley (LA)
Meredith Keel (USA)
Tara Oltmann (TXST)Jade Sinness (TROY)Katie Lively (TROY)All Conference Second TeamKelly Horne (TROY)Meagan King (TXST)
Mackenzie Brasher (USA)
Bailee Wilson (GASO)
Makiya Thomas (CCU)
Kaitlyn Alderink (LA)
Abby Krzywiecki (USA)
Kenzie Longanecker (APP)
Alissa Dalton (LA)
Julie Rawls (LA)
Korie Kreps (ULM)
Kayla Rosado (CCU)
Justice Milz (LA)
Gabby Buruato (APP)
Arieann Bell (TXST)References:'''

Rankings

References

Troy
Troy Trojans softball
Troy Trojans softball seasons